I65 or I-165 may refer to:
Interstate 165 (disambiguation)